The Russian Cup is an annual major national Russian sports award given to tennis players, coaches, companies and other organizations and people that contributed to the development of this sport in Russia. The cup was established in 1994 by then-Vice President of the Russian Tennis Federation Dmitry Vikharev and the President of IC Arman. It was organized by Anatoly Gusev in the following two years, and after his death in 1996 his wife Lyudmila Guseva and businessman Alexander Cherkasov continued its organization.

Since 1998, the committee includes such major tennis people as President of the RTF Shamil Tarpishchev. In 1998 the place for the ceremony was relocated from the Cinema Centre "Solovey" on the Krasnaya Presna to the Radisson Slavyanskaya Hotel. Only once, in 2003, was the award presented in the Cinema House in Moscow. The awardee receives a statue illustrating the Russian two-headed eagle, which was created by designer Igor Kamenev. It can't be bought although it exists in the catalog of its supplier. The Kremlin Cup was named top tournament nine times, once as the organizer of the professional and the junior events.

Awardees

1994
 Male Player of the Year – Yevgeny Kafelnikov
 Female Player of the Year – Elena Makarova
 Doubles Player of the Year – Andrei Olhovskiy
 Coach of the Year – A. Lepeshin
 Youth Coach of the Year – N. Rogova
 Favourite Publication – Теннис+
 Best Sports Base – Luzhniki
 Best Foreign Businessman – Sason Kakschuri (Switzerland)
 Best Individual Contribution – Shamil Tarpishchev
 Best Foreign Contribution – VOLKL Pro-Kennex
 "Big Hat" – E. Panteleyev, V. Alyoshin
 Best Regional Federation – St. Petersburg

1995
 Male Player of the Year – Yevgeny Kafelnikov
 Female Player of the Year – Elena Makarova
 Triumph of the Year – Andrei Chesnokov
 Coach of the Year – A. Lepeshin
 Youth Coach of the Year – L. Preobrazhenskaya
 Tournament of the Year – Samara Ladies Open
 Best Sports Base – Olympic Stadium
 Best Individual Contribution – O. Soskovets
 Best Foreign Contribution – ITALTEL
 "Big Hat" – A. Korzhakov, G. Melikyan
 Best National Sponsor – Trans WorldMetals
 Best Contribution of a City – Moscow
 Favourite Youth Sports School – Spartak

1996
 Male Player of the Year – Yevgeny Kafelnikov
 Female Player of the Year – Elena Likhovtseva
 Triumph of the Year – Anna Kournikova
 Coach of the Year – A. Lepeshin
 Youth Coach of the Year – L. Preobrazhenskaya
 Tournament of the Year – St. Petersburg Open
 Best Sports Base – Kristal-Avangard
 Best Individual Contribution – Yuri Luzhkov
 "Big Hat" – A. Gusev, V. Ilyushin
 Best Contribution of a City – Sochi
 Favourite Youth Sports School – Saratov

1997
 Male Player of the Year – Yevgeny. Kafelnikov
 Female Player of the Year – Anna Kournikova
 Triumph of the Year – Alexander Volkov
 Newcomer of the Year – Lina Krasnoroutskaya
 Surprise of the Year – Girls Under-16: E. Dementieva, A. Myskina, G. Fatakhetdinova; captain and coach K. Bogorodetsky; Girls Under-14: E. Bovina, L. Krasnoroutskaya, G. Fokina; captain R. Zabirov
 Coach of the Year – K. Bogorodetsky
 Tournament of the Year – Women's Kremlin Cup
 Best Foreign Businessman – Y. Scott (USA)
 Best Individual Contribution – Y. Luzhkov
 "Big Hat" – V. Yumashev, S. Yastrzhembsky
 Best Developed City for Tennis – Samara Oblast, Governor K. A. Titov
 Contribution of the Year – A. E. Krupnov, head of an informatics GOC; V. S. Lagutin, Director of Moscow City Telephone Network; V. L. Rozhdestvensky, President of Glavmosstroy; N. I. Karpov, head of the administration of Sochi
 Favourite Sports Commentator – E. Fedyakov
 Best Individual Contribution to Senior Tennis – S. Mirza
 Best Contribution to Handicapped Sport – L. Shevchik
 Best Contribution to Science – A. Skorodumova

1998
 Male Player of the Year – Yevgeny Kafelnikov
 Female Player of the Year – Anna Kournikova
 Triumph of the Year – Marat Safin
 Newcomer of the Year – Nadezhda Petrova
 Tournament of the Year – Kremlin Cup
 Youth Coach of the Year – P. Islanova
 Best Sports Base – Shiryaevo Pole, Olympic Stadium
 Best Contribution to Tennis Science – Cathedra of Tennis RGAFK S. P. Belits-Geyman
 "Big Hat" – Y. Luzhkov, E. Panteleev
 Best Contribution of a City – Moscow
 Favourite Youth Sports School – CSKA Moscow
 Best Developed City for Tennis – Kaluga Oblast, Obninsk
 Best Contribution to Team Tennis – Tatiana Panova
 Best Mass Media Project – Радио-Спорт
 Best National Sponsor – Rostelekom

1999
 Male Player of the Year – Yevgeny Kafelnikov
 Triumph of the Year – Lina Krasnoroutskaya
 Coach of the Year – K. Bogorodetsky
 Youth Coach of the Year – Family Krasnoroutsky
 Female Team of the Year – E. Likhovtseva, T. Panova, E. Dementieva, E. Makarova; coaches K. Bogorodetsky, Dmitry Dyagterev
 Girls Under-18 Team of the Year – E. Dementieva, A. Myskina, O. Mikhaylova; coach K. Bogorodetsky
 Success of the Year – Girls Under-14: R. Islanova, A. Bastrikova, N. Bratchikova, D. Safina
 Tournament of the Year – Kremlin Cup
 Best Contribution to the Theory of Tennis Science – V. Golenko
 Best Foreign Sponsor – Mobitel
 Best Contribution of a City – Moscow
 Best Contribution to the Development of Tennis Practigues and Methods – V. Yanchuk
 "Big Hat" – C. Calmy, D. Perminov
 Best Tennis Publication – Tennis Encyclopedia by B. Fomenko
 Journalist of the Year – O. Spassky
 Best Individual Contribution – Y. Kalagursky
 Best Sports Base – Sport Complex "Zhivopisny"
 Best Regional Tennis Club – Tolyatti Tennis Centre
 Best Youth Tennis Club – Spartak
 Best National Sponsor – Plaza

2000
 Male Player of the Century – Yevgeny Kafelnikov
 Female Player of the Century – Olga Morozova
 Progress of the Year – Elena Dementieva
 Triumph of the Year – Marat Safin
 Team of the Year – Under-14 girls: D. Chermarda, I. Kotkina, V. Dushevina; coach E. Manyukov
 Team of the Year – Under-14 boys: A. Sitak, S. Matsukevich, N. Solovyev; coach V. Gorelov
 Coach of the Year – R. Islanova
 Tournament of the Century – Kremlin Cup
 Best Contribution of a City – Moscow
 Best Individual Contribution – O. Kornblit
 "Big Hat" – V. Sokolov, A. Ivanchenko
 Best Developed City for Tennis – Khanty-Mansi Autonomous Okrug, Surgut
 Best Contribution to Popularization of Tennis – Anna Dmitrieva
 Sponsor of the Year – Siberian Aluminium
 Best Individual Contribution – Shamil Tarpishchev
 Best Tennis Project – Tennis Academy "Valeri"

2001
 Male Player of the Year – Yevgeny Kafelnikov
 Female Player of the Year – Elena Dementieva
 Newcomer of the Year – Svetlana Kuznetsova
 Team of the Year – E. Dementieva, N. Petrova, L. Krasnoroutskaya, E. Likhovtseva, E. Bovina, captain S. Tarpishchev; coach L. Neiland
 Amateur Player of the Year – Aleksandr Sharapov
 Amateur Team of the Year – CASA-International: V. Sokolov, A. Sharapov, R. Gamov, C. Askerov
 Tournament of the Century – Kremlin Cup
 Best Contribution of Popularization of Tennis – Valerya Titova
 Best Contribution to Tennis Science – Igor Vsevolodov
 Best Individual Contribution, Development of Tennis in Siberia – Sergey Sobyanin
 Best Individual Contribution, Development of Tennis in Mordovia – Nikolay Merkushkin
 Best Individual Contribution and Development of Tennis – Anatoly Oplanchuk
 Best Individual Contribution and Development of Tennis – Yuri Laptev
 Best Contribution of a City – Moscow
 Best Individual Contribution to Regional Tennis – Vladimir Gusev
 Best Tennis Publication – 40:30
 "Big Hat" – M. Dunayevsky, A. Redko
 Partners of the Year – Rusal, Bank of Moscow
 Best Tennis School – Luzhniki

2002
 Success of the Year – E. Bovina, S. Kuznetsova, D. Safina, A. Myskina
 Success of the Year in Doubles – E. Likhovtseva, E. Dementieva
 Progress of the Year – V. Dushevina, M. Kirilenko
 Team of the Year – E. Kafelnikov, M. Safin, M. Youzhny, S. Leonyuk, B. Sobkin, A. Cherkasov, V. Okhapkin, S. Yasnitsky, A. Glebov
 Amateur of the Year – Aleksandr Sharapov
 Amateurs of the Year – Team Rossgosstrakh: E. Arkusha, A. Sanguliya, R. Sarkisov
 Tournament of the Year – Mordovia Cup (ATP Futures)
 Best Contribution of Secure Tennis – Evgeny Gulinsky
 Best Multiannual Contribution to the Preparation of Tennis Picture Frames – Tatyana Ivanova
 Best Contribution to Professional Tennis in Russia – Vladimir Bakulev
 Project of the Year – Vladimir Lazarev
 Best Contribution to Amateur Tennis – Viktor Pavlov
 Best Outside Perspective – Leonid Zinkevich
 Best Contribution to Regional Tennis Programs – Sibnefteprovod
 Best Contribution of a City – Moscow
 Best Contribution of Tennis Base and to the Win of Team Russia at the Davis Cup – Luzhniki
 Best Individual Contribution – Boris Yeltsin
 Best Tennis Publication – Nikolay Mikhaylov
 Partners of the Year – Bank of Moscow, Ingosstrakh
 "Big Hat" – A. Braverman, D. Belov

2003
 Male Player of the Year – Nikolay Davydenko
 Female Tennis Player of the Year – Anastasia Myskina
 Newcomer of the Year – Maria Sharapova
 Best Tennis Courage – Club Ikar: V. Demenko, N. Korzenev, A. Fedotov, N. Bakhmatova, L. Bubnova, A. Fokin, M. Sarychev
 Amateurs of the Year – Women's Singles: E. Baykova; Men's Singles: A. Sharapov; Men's Doubles: A. Sharapov, C. Askerov; Tournament: Cupper Cup, St. Petersburg
 Coach of the Year – Oksana Rodina
 Tournament of the Year – Governor Cup of the Moscow Oblast
 Best Tennis Club – Balashikha
 Recognition in Russia – Francesco Ricci Bitti
 Best Contribution to Tennis Base – Concept-90, Davor Sharin
 Best Contribution to the Organization of Tennis Tournaments – Vladimir Tolkatsir
 Best Partner of the Russian Tennis Federation – R. Safin, S. Tarpishchev
 Best Alliance in Arts and Tennis – N. Karachentsev, People's Artist of Russia, organizer of the Russian Cup; A. Cherkasov, producer of the Russian Cup, head of the Board of Directors of Sadko-Arkada
 Umpire of the Year – Dmitry Maksimov
 Featured Picture of the Year – V. Evtushenko, A. Golutva, A. Mikhaylov: Break Point

2004
 Male Player of the Year – Marat Safin
 Team of the Year – Russia Fed Cup team: A. Myskina, S. Kuznetsova, V. Zvonareva, E. Likhovtseva; captain Shamil Tarpishchev; coaches L. Savchenko-Neiland and D. Degtyarev; physicians D. Sharipov and S. Yasnitsky; masseur A. Glebov
 Success of the Year in Doubles – Nadezhda Petrova
 Amateurs of the Year – Women's Singles – O. Boytenko; Men's Singles – V. Olkov; Men's Doubles – A. Sharapov, C. Askerov
 Coach of the Year – Boris Sobkin
 Youth Coach of the Year – Yuri Yudkin
 Legend – Alexander Metreveli
 Honour – Nina Teplyakova
 Tennis Hospitality – Guram Mzhavanadze
 Tournament of the Year – Kremlin Cup (youth)
 Journalist of the Year – Aleksandr Darakhvelidze
 Best Contribution to Tennis – Lev Agayan
 Best Contribution to the Organization of Tennis Tournaments – Vladimir Kamelson
 Best Regional Tennis Federation – Ruben Amaryan, President of RTF in the Moscow Oblast
 Best Regional Tennis Club – "Dinastiya", Saint Petersburg

2005
 Male Player of the Year – Nikolay Davydenko
 Female Player of the Year – Maria Sharapova
 Team of the Year – Fed Cup team: A. Myskina, E. Dementieva, V. Dushevina, D. Safina; captain S. Tarpishchev; coaches A. Volkov, L. Savchenko and M. Mosyakova; physician S. Yasnitsky; masseur D. Sharipov
 Coach of the Year – Eduard Davydenko
 Youth Coach of the Year – Viktor Pavlov
 Girls Under-18 Team of the Year – A. Kudryavtseva, Y. Shvedova, E. Makarova; captain E. Manyukov
 Girls Under-14 Team of the Year – A. Pavluychenkova, E. Kulikova, M. Sirotkina; captain A. Sikanov
 Journalist of the Year – Andrey Novikov
 Best Tennis Publication – Tennis & Business (Теннис и бизнес)
 Best National Sponsors – "Rostransmash", Yuri Laptev
 Best Sponsors – FENIKS, NIKE
 Best Contribution of Tennis Base – LLC "TKSSSTROY", Konstantin Kuleshov
 Tennis Mums – V. Dementieva, G. Myskina, R. Islanova

2006
 Male Player of the Year – Nikolay Davydenko
 Female Player of the Year – Maria Sharapova (i.a.)
 Progress of the Year – Anastasia Pavlyuchenkova
 Team of the Year – Under-14 Youth: A. Khacharyan, R. Muyaev, A. Rumyantsev; coaches: M. Kashuba, A. Kalivod
 Coach of the Year – Eduard Davydenko
 Match of the Year – Dmitry Tursunov
 Tennis Longevity – Georgy Safirov
 Best Contribution to Tennis – A. Bokarev, head of board of directors of "Kuzbassrazrezugol"
 Best Contribution to Amateur Tennis – Y. Luzhkov, E. Panteleev
 Best Contribution of Popularization of Tennis – НТВ+ Теннис
 Best Contribution of Regional Tennis – Governor of the Penza Oblast V. Bochkarev
 Best Contribution to Tennis Science – RuKort
 Best Contribution to Tennis Justice – Valery Lutkov
 Best Contribution to Tennis Education – V. Golenko, A. Skorodumova, S. Tarpishchev

2007
 Male Player of the Year – Igor Andreev
 Female Player of the Year – Anna Chakvetadze
 Team of the Year – S. Kuznetsova, A. Chakvedatze, N. Petrova, E. Vesnina, A. Kudryavtseva; assistants: S. Tarpishchev, A. Volkov, A. Zlatoustov, A. Glebov, S. Yasnitsky, D. Sharipov, L. Savchenko
 Doubles Player of the Year – Dinara Safina
 Mixed Doubles Team of the Year – Dmitry Tursunov, Nadezhda Petrova
 Youth Under-14 Boys Team of the Year – A. Volkov, M. Baks, E. Karlovsky; captain M. Kashuba
 Youth Under-12 Girls Team of the Year – Y. Putintseva, I. Khromacheva, M. Aleksandrova
 Amateur Players of the Year – L. Smelyansky, A. Balashova, D. Chepelev, M. Eydlen, D. Maslov, E. Traychun, E. Danilchenko
 Coach of the Year – Viktor Pavlov
 Best Tennis Base – Youth Tennis Academy of Vsevolod
 Best Contribution to Tennis – Yelzin Fund
 Best Contribution to Regional Tennis – Moscow
 Partner of the Federation – Andrey Bokarev

2008
 Male Player of the Year – Nikolay Davydenko
 Breakthrough of the Year – Dinara Safina
 Triumph of the Year – Elena Dementieva
 Team of the Year – Fed Cup team: M. Sharapova, S. Kuznetsova, A. Chakvedatze, D. Safina, V. Zvonareva, E. Makarova, E. Vesnina; assistants: S. Tarpishchev, L. Savchenko, S. Yasnitsky, A. Glebov, D. Sharipov, A. Zlatoustov
 Best Training for the Davis Cup team – Commander-in-Chief of the Internal Troops of the Ministry of Internal Affairs of Russia, General N. Rogozhin
 Youth Under-16 Boys Team of the Year – M. Biryukov, R. Muzaev, A. Koshtanov; captain V. Gorelov
 Youth Under-18 Girls Team of the Year – A. Pivovarova, K. Pervak, K. Lykina; coach Yevgeniya Manyukova
 Coach of the Year – Rauza Islanova
 Tournament of the Year – Kremlin Cup (pro), Kremlin Cup (youth)
 Journalist of the Year – Dmitry Grantsev
 Best Tennis Base – Centre of Tennis Education in Khanty-Mansiysk
 Amateur Tournament Series of the Year – 'Amatur'
 Best Contribution to Regional Tennis – Anatoly Pushkov, mayor of Tolyatti; Moscow

2009
 Best Contribution to Russian and World Tennis – Marat Safin
 Breakthrough of the Year – Dinara Safina
 Newcomer of the Year – Andrey Kuznetsov
 Team of the Year – Team Russia at the Universiade in Belgrade: E. Makarova, K. Lykina, V. Diatchenko, E. Donskoy, T. Ivanova, L. Ivanov
 Youth Under-16 Girls Team of the Year – K. Kirillova, D. Gavrilova, P. Leykina, O. Rodina
 Amateurs of the Year – 'Amatur'
 Best Tennis Base – 'Tennis-Siti' of Almyetevsk
 Best Contribution to National Tennis – Russian Tennis Tour
 Best Assistance to Russian Tennis and Sports – Aleksey Kulakovsky
 Best Regional Tennis Federation – TF Moscow Oblast
 Best Contribution to Tennis Science – Olga Zhikhareva
 Best Contribution to TV Journalism – Aleksandr Metreveli
 Ambassador of Free Will of Tennis – Konstantin Zatulin
 Most Tennis Parlament – Y. Borisovets, A. Gubkin, O. Arzhbe, D. Sablin, S. Neverov, S. Smetanyuk, K. Zatulin, O. Kovalev; captain I. Gimaletdinov

2010
 Best Contribution to Russian and World Tennis – Elena Dementieva
 Male Player of the Year – Mikhail Youzhny
 Female Player of the Year – Vera Zvonareva
 Breakthrough of the Year – Daria Gavrilova
 Youth Under-16 Girls Team of the Year – O. Rodina, V. Kan, D. Gavrilova, M. Gasparyan
 Youth Under-14 Girls Team of the Year – K. Sharipova, P. Yuzefovich, U. Ayzatulina
 Youth Under-16 Dream Team of the Year – M. Biryukov, A. Rumyantsev, V. Baluda, R. Muzaev
 Coach of the Year – Aleksandr Kuznetsov
 Youth Coach of the Year – Evgeniya Kryuchkova
 Tournament of the Year – Moscow Championships
 Best Tennis Base – Kazan Tennis Center
 Journalist of the Year – Vyacheslav Shorikov
 Best Contribution to Tennis – Aleksandr Ponomarenko, Ivan Shabalov, Yaroslav Kalagursky
 Best Tennis Counsel – Vladimir Solntsev

2011
 Hero of the Year – Mikhail Youzhny
 Team of the Year – Girls Under-14: A. Rychagova, A. Komardina, V. Kudermetova, D. Kasatkina; coaches V. Fadeev, E. Makarova
 Debuts of the Year – I. Bulykina, L. Nanava, G. Fattakhetdinova
 Junior of the Year – Aslan Karatsev
 Amateur Players of the Year – A. Prokofieva, E. Chausova, O. Smirnova, A. Chuzharov, V. Voloshin, V. Zhvanko, D. Budanov, A. Burnashov
 Coach for the Year – Mikhail Sarychev
 Umpire of the Year – Andrey Zimin
 Tournament of the Year – Youth European Championships
 Journalist of the Year – Aleksandr Zilbert
 Businessman of the Year – Aleksandr Brilyantshchikov
 Tennis City – Moscow
 Best Contribution to Tennis – Tatarstan
 Best Contribution to Youth Tennis – Andrey Babaev
 Best Contribution to Tennis Science – Galina Ivanova

2012
 Female Players of the Year – M. Sharapova, M. Kirilenko, N. Petrova, E. Makarova
 Team of the Year – Girls Under-16: O. Rodina, E. Kulichkova, D. Kasatkina, A. Silich
 Breakthrough of the Year – Irina Bulykina, Aleksey Kravtsov
 Senior Player of the Year – Mikhail Novik
 Amateur Players of the Year – (45+): V. Kotovshchikov; (45-): E. Borisov; Men's Doubles: I. Rubinchik, E. Traychun; Mixed: A. Shoshev, Y. Vorobyeva
 Coach of the Year – Evgeniya Manyukova
 Tournaments of the Year – Moscow Championships, Ozerov Cup, Mordovia Cup
 Best Tennis Federation – TF Penza Oblast
 Best Contribution to Tennis – Vladimir Lazarev
 Best Contribution to Kids Tennis – International Tennis Academy in Khimki
 Best Tennis Base – Novokuznetsk Tennis Academy
 Best Tennis Region – Samara Oblast
 Best Contribution to Tennis Science – Vadim Gushchin
 Best Tennis Physician – Sergey Yasnitsky
 Partner of the Year – Babolat
 Best Tennis Counsel – Yuri Utin

2013
 Female Player of the Year – Polina Shakirova (wheelchair, born 26.01.1995)
 Pair of the Year – Elena Vesnina and Ekaterina Makarova
 Team of the Year – Girls Under-16: V. Kudermetova, D. Kasatkina, A. Pospelova; captain O. Mishukova; Boys Under-16: A. Rublev, R. Safiulin, E. Tyurnev; captain I. Pridankin; Boys Under-14: A. Dubrivny, F. Klimov, D. Voronin, A. Avidzba; captain A. Deripasko
 Junior of the Year – Karen Khachanov
 Comeback of the Year – Alisa Kleybanova
 Best Contribution to Tennis – Igor Andreev, Anna Chakvetadze
 Team of the Youth – S. Tarpishchev, A. Metreveli, V. Egorov, V. Korotkov, A. Volkov, S. Likhachev
 Amateur Players of the Year – E. Traychun, E. Borisov, E. Sventitskaya, L. Feklyunina
 Best Individual Contribution to Youth Tennis – Aleksandr Ostrovsky
 Best Contribution to Regional Tennis – 'Nasledie' Fund
 Best Contribution to Tennis Infrastructure – Concept 90
 Most Trustworthy Partner – Bank of Moscow
 Best International Partner – Samsung
 Best Technical Partner – Land Rover
 Most Devouted Fan – Naina Yeltsina

2014
 Legend – Natalya Vetoshnikova
 Team of the Year – Wheelchair Team: I. Shaykhislamov, A. Saitgareev, V. Lvov; coaches O. Murina, S. Muldagaliev
 Pair of the Year – Elena Vesnina and Ekaterina Makarova
 Juniors of the Year – Andrey Rublev, Darya Kasatkina
 Tournament of the Year – Kremlin Cup
 Tennis Eye – Robert Maksimov
 Journalist of the Year – Natalya Bykanova
 Best Contribution to Tennis – Nikolay Davydenko

2015
 Teams of the Year – Fed Cup team; Russia Girls Under-18 team; Russia Girls Under-16 team; Russia Girls Under-14 team; Russia Boys Under-14 team
 Juniors of the Year – Roman Safiulin and Sofya Zhuk
 Tournament of the Year – Governor Cup, Astrakhan Oblast
 Tournament and Team of the Year – Team Championships in Beach Tennis and Russia Beach Tennis team
 Best Contribution to Tennis – Vladimir Dmitriev
 Best Contribution to the Victory in Tennis – Primorsky Krai
 Best Contribution to World Tennis – Francesco Ricci Bitti
 Best Contribution to Regional Tennis – Ryazan Oblast
 Best Contribution to the Development of Tennis – Vitaly Mutko; Naina Yeltsina

2016
 Female Player of the Year – Svetlana Kuznetsova, Viktoriia Lvova (wheelchair, born 01.10.1998)
 Juniors of the Year – Avelina Sayfetdinova and Daniella Medvedeva
 Pair of the Year – Elena Vesnina and Ekaterina Makarova
 Teams of the Year – Russia Girls Under-19 team (Elena Rybakina, Amina Anshba, Anastasia Gasanova; coach Elena Makarova); Russia Girls Under-17 team (Olesya Pervushina, Anastasia Potapova, Taisia Pachkaleva, Varvara Gracheva; coach Oksana Mishukova); Russia Boys Under-17 team (Alen Avidzba, Timofey Skatov, Alexey Zakharov, Egor Noskin; coach Artem Deripaska); Beach Tennis team (Darya Churakova, Irina Glimakova, Yulia Chubarova, Nikita Burmakin, Ivan Syrov, Sergey Kuptsov; coach Stanislav Zaychenko
 Coach of the Year – Shamil Tarpishchev
 Tournament of the Year – Megafon Dream Cup (wheelchair), Kazan World Gran Prix (beach tennis)
 Best Contribution to the Tennis Infrastructure – Alexey Alexandrov (Western Okrug)
 Best Contribution to the Development of Tennis – Yakov Shakhtin (VTB Kremlin Cup)

2017
 "Golden Duo" – Elena Vesnina and Ekaterina Makarova
 Team of the Year – 
Darya Frayman, Kamila Rakhimova, Anastasia Tikhonova; captain Oksana Mishukova
Elena Rybakina, Sofya Lansere, Anastasia Kharitonova; captain Elena Makarova
 Juniors of the Year – Timofey Skatov, Oksana Selekhmetyeva, Maria Timofeyeva, Diana Shnayder
 Juniors of the Year (wheelchair) – Sergey Lysov and Alexey Shuklin
 Success of the Year – Lyudmila Nikoyan and Nikolay Guryev, Ekaterina Kamenetskaya and Veronika Pershina, Ekaterina Glazkova and Anna Romanova, Agniya Bogatova and Darya Kalichinina (beach tennis)
 Coaches of Champions – Evgenina Manyukova and Sergey Vesnin
 General of the Year – Yakov Shatkhin, vice-president and general secretary of the RTF (Russian Tennis Federation)
 Journalist of the Year – Daniil Salnikov, editor of the Tennis section of the site Championat.com
 Best Contribution to Popularization of Tennis – international children's camp "Artek"
 Best Contribution to Children's Tennis – Tatyana Zinina, director of the Adler Tennis Academy
 Best Contribution to Regional Tennis – Aleksandr Kosarev, merited president of the Samara Tennis Federation
 Partner of the Year – VTB Bank
 In Memory – Igor Volk, former president of the All-Union Tennis Federation

2018
 Male Player of the Year – Karen Khachanov
 Contribution to Justice in Tennis – Anatoly Maksimov
 Team of the Year (under-19, wheelchair) – Sergey Lysov, Leonid Gubanov, Vadim Obukhov, Olga Murina, Serik Muldagaliev
 Team of the Year (under-17) – Oksana Selekhmetyeva, Alina Charayeva, Elina Avanesyan, Oksana Mishukova
 Team of the Year (under-15) – Diana Shnayder, Erika Andreyeva, Nadezhda Khalturina, Aleksandr Krasnorutsky
 Junior of the Year – Konstantin Zhzhenov
 For the Contribution to Regional Tennis – Vladimir Gusev
 Success of the Year (beach tennis) – Ekaterina Glazkova, Anna Romanova
 For the Long-Term Representation of Russia in ITF – Roman Murashkovsky
 For the Contribution to Russian and International Tennis – Mikhail Youzhny
 Once-For-All-Time Coach – Boris Sobkin
 For the Contribution to Worldwide Sports and Tennis – Shamil Tarpishchev

2019
 Legend – Alexander Metreveli
 Male Player of the Year – Daniil Medvedev
 Student Tennis Players of the Year – Ivan Gakhov, Yana Sizikova
 Team of the Year – Andrey Rublev, Karen Khachanov, Daniil Medvedev, Evgeny Donskoy, Shamil Tarpishchev (Davis Cup team)
 Team of the Year (under-15) – Anastasia Guryeva, Elena Pridankina, Yaroslava Bartashevich, Aleksandr Krasnorutsky
 Team of the Year (under-16) – Aristarkh Safonov, Igor Kudryashov, Robert Korelov, Yevgeny Savchenko
 Team of the Year (under-17) – Polina Kudermetova, Oksana Selekhmetyeva, Diana Shnayder, Oksana Mishukova
 Junior of the Year – Polina Kudermetova
 Tennis Eye – Aleksandr Bondarev
 For the Contribution to Children's Tennis and for the Support of Professional Tennis – tennis school "Zhemchuzhina", headed by Yulia Fursova
 Success of the Year (beach tennis) – Arina Kosenkova, Anastasia Semenova (under-15); Elizaveta Tkachenko, Daniil Pokidin (under-15, mixed doubles); Ekaterina Glazkova, Veronika Pershina (under-19); Ekaterina Glazkova, Vasily Reutov (under-19, mixed)
 Team of the Year (beach tennis) – Nikita Burmakin, Sergey Kuptsov
 Best Tennis Club – "Balashikha"

2020
The ceremony was postponed to 2021 due to a lack of tournaments held because of the COVID-19 pandemic.

2021
The offline ceremony wasn't held due to the COVID-19 pandemic in Russia but the awards were presented through a documentary (online ceremony analogue).
 Male Player of the Year — Daniil Medvedev.
 Female Player of the Year — Anastasia Pavlyuchenkova.
 Team of the Year:
 BJK Cup winners — Igor Andreev (captain), Anastasia Pavlyuchenkova, Liudmila Samsonova, Veronika Kudermetova, Daria Kasatkina, Ekaterina Alexandrova.	
 Davis Cup winners — Shamil Tarpishchev (captain), Daniil Medvedev, Andrey Rublev, Karen Khachanov, Aslan Karatsev, Evgeny Donskoy.
 Girls (under-15), won the World Championship — Mirra Andreeva, Daria Egorova, Alina Korneeva. Captain - Alexander Krasnorutsky.	
 Girls (under-19), won the European Championship — Diana Shnaider, Polina Kudermetova, Erika Andreeva. Captain - Elena Makarova.
 Boys (under-17), won the Junior Davis Cup — Maxim Zhukov, Yaroslav Demin, Danil Panarin. Captain - Ivan Pridankin.	
For the contribution to the development of regional tennis — Alexander Verkhovsky (Sakhalin Oblast).	
For the contribution to the victory — Igor Andreev, Igor Kunitsyn, Sergei Demekhine, Anton Zaitsev, Alexander Dolgov, Sergei Yasnitsky, Dmitry Krutikov, Ilya Rappoport, Nikolai Polfuntikov, Ivan Trofimov, Yuri Aseev, Maxim Kozin, Alexander Pavlyuchenkov, Evgeny Alexandrov, Andrei Olhovskiy.	
For the contribution to the development of Russian tennis — Vladimir Gusev.	
Olympians—2020 (pre-games RTF training camp participants) — Karen Khachanov, Andrey Rublev, Aslan Karatsev, Elena Vesnina, Anastasia Pavlyuchenkova, Ekaterina Alexandrova, Veronika Kudermetova.
 Children's Coach — Marina Marenko.	
 Triumph of the Year — Nikita Burmakin (beach tennis; won the 2021 ITF Beach Tennis Championships in doubles, with Tommaso Giovannini).
 "Golden Sand" (beach tennis):
Girls (under-17), won the World Championship — Angelina Klimuk and Elizaveta Tkachenko. 
Girls (under-19), won the European Championship — Arina Kosenkova and Anastasia Semenova. 
Mixed pair, won the World Championship — Elizaveta Tkachenko and Grigory Agafonov.

2022 
Ceremony was held during the Moscow river cruise.
 Triumph of the Year — Veronika Kudermetova
 Junior of the Year — Diana Shnaider	
 For many years of contribution to the promotion of Russian tennis — Anna Dmitrieva	
 For contribution to the preparation of the national teams of Russia — Alexander Bogomolov	
 The best children's coach — Evgenia Kulikovskaya	
 For long-term achievements in the development of Russian tennis — Tatarstan Tennis Federation	
 For contribution to the development of tennis infrastructure in Russia — Sergey Tsivilev	
 For contribution to the development of regional tennis — Yuri Gerasimov	
 For contribution to the training of coaching staff — Olga Zhikhareva	
 The best youth tournament — Tournament named after V. Gulidov	
 Juniors of the year (beach tennis): Yuliana Andreeva, Ekaterina Stepanova, Olesya Borodina, Arseniy Tarasov, Diana Izraileva, Anastasia Stepanyuk, Elizaveta Kudinova, Dmitry Pavlov

Records
Total number
 11 awards — Shamil Tarpishchev  (1994, 2000 — Best Individual Contribution; 2002, 2021 — captain of the Team of the Year: Davis Cup; 2001, 2004, 2005, 2007, 2008 — captain of the Team of the Year: Fed Cup; 2003 — (together with Ralif Safin) Partner of the Year; 2006 — Best contribution to the methodology of teaching tennis).
 10 awards — Elena Dementieva (1997 — Surprise of the Year – Girls Under-16 Team; 1999 — Team of the Year and Girls Under-18 Team of the Year; 2000 — Progress of the Year; 2001 — Female Player of the Year and Team of the Year; 2002 — Success of the Year in Doubles; 2005 — Team of the Year; 2008 — Triumph of the Year; 2010 — Best Contribution to the Russian and World Tennis).
 9 awards — Yevgeny Kafelnikov (1994—99, 2001 — Male Player of the Year; 2000 — Male Player of the Century; 2002 — Team of the Year: Davis Cup).
Male Tennis Player of the Year
 7 awards — Yevgeny Kafelnikov (1994—99, 2001)
Female Tennis Player of the Year
 3 awards — Maria Sharapova (2005—06, 2012)
Youngest 
 Irina Khromacheva (12 years, 6 months, 5 days) in 2007.
Oldest 
 Georgy Safirov (94 years) in 2006.

References

External links
Official website 

Tennis awards
Russian awards
Tennis in Russia